Stefan Reinartz (20 September 1925 – 5 July 2007) was a German rower. He competed in the men's eight event at the 1952 Summer Olympics.

References

1925 births
2007 deaths
German male rowers
Olympic rowers of Germany
Rowers at the 1952 Summer Olympics
Rowers from Cologne